Carpio (Latin for "carp") may refer to:

Places
 Becerril del Carpio, an urban village in Alar del Rey, Palencia, Castilla-Leon, Spain
 Carpio, North Dakota, a city in Ward County, North Dakota, USA
 Carpio de Azaba, a municipality in Salamanca, Spain
 Cosamaloapan de Carpio, a municipality in Veracruz, Mexico
 Diego del Carpio, a municipality located in the province of Ávila, Castile and León, Spain
 El Carpio, Valladolid, a village in Valladolid province, Spain
 El Carpio, a city in Córdoba, Spain
 El Carpio de Tajo, a village in Toledo, Spain
 Santa Cruz Venta de Carpio, an urban village in San Cristóbal Ecatepec, Ecatepec de Morelos, Mexico

Fish
 Carpiodes carpio, the river carpsucker
 Cyprinus carpio, the common carp or European carp
 Salmo carpio (carpione del Garda), a salmonid fish

People
Carpio is a surname in the Spanish language.
Notable people of this surname are:
 Alfredo Arce Carpio, Bolivian politician, legal figure, and intellectual.
 Antonio Carpio,  Associate Justice of the Supreme Court of the Philippines
 Armando Carpio Sanchez, Filipino engineer and politician.
 Bernardo Carpio, a Philippine legendary hero named after the Spanish Bernardo del Carpio.
 Bernardo del Carpio, legendary hero of medieval Spanish legend
 Cayetano Carpio, Salvadoran activist, founder of the FMLN
 Conchita Carpio-Morales,  Associate Justice of the Supreme Court of the Philippines
 Daniela Carpio, a Guatemalan-Swiss singer-songwriter, musician, visual artist, director and producer.
 Eduardo Manuitt Carpio, (born 1950) is a Venezuelan politician.
 Esteban Carpio, American murder suspect
 Félix Lope de Vega Carpio, full name of Lope de Vega, Spanish playwright, poet, and novelist
 Franco Carpio, Peruvian politician
 Javier Carpio, Spanish football (soccer) player
 Jorge Carpio Nicolle, assassinated Guatemalan politician (1993), unsuccessful presidential candidate (1985)
 José Carpio (born 1966), Ecuadorian football (soccer) referee
 Luis Enrique Carpio, Peruvian politician, unsuccessful vice presidential candidate (2006)
 Luzmila Carpio, Bolivian chanteuse, ambassador to France
 Mans Carpio, a Filipino lawyer who is currently the wife of current Vice President of the Philippines Sara Duterte
 Manuel Carpio, Mexican poet
 Mark Anthony Carpio, Philippine choral conductor
 Miguel Malvar y Carpio, Filipino general who served during the Philippine Revolution the Philippine–American War.
 Rafael Carpio, Mexican former sports shooter.
 Ramiro de León Carpio, President of Guatemala 1993-1996
 Roberto Carpio, former Vice President of Guatemala.
 Rita Carpio, Hong Kong pop singer of Filipino and Chinese descent
 Rustica Carpio, was a Filipino actress
 Sara Duterte-Carpio, current Vice President of the Philippines
 Teresa Carpio, Hong Kong singer and actress of Filipino and Shanghainese descent
 T. V. Carpio, American actress and singer of Filipino and Chinese descent

See also 
 
 Carpi (surname)
 Carpino
 Carpino (surname)